The Providence Pilots are the varsity college sports teams from Providence University College and Theological Seminary located in Otterburne, Manitoba.  For over twenty years, the teams competed as the Freemen before changing the name in 2013 to the more gender-neutral and institutionally relevant nickname, Pilots.  The Pilots play Men's and Women's soccer, volleyball, basketball, and hockey.  The Pilots compete in the NCCAA (soccer, basketball), NIAC (basketball, volleyball), ACCA (basketball), NIRSA (volleyball), NIVC (volleyball), and MCAC (hockey, soccer, basketball).  The school won NIAC and NIVC Championships in Women's basketball and volleyball in the 2006-07 season.

2006-2007 Pilots Athletics

The 2006-2007 season was another successful season for Freemen athletics.  The Men's soccer team had a very strong season with a Varsity and Junior Varsity teams competing in CPAC with the Varsity team competing in NCCAA.  The Varsity Men's Soccer team won the CPAC championship soundly over the CMU Blazers 6-1.  They carried that momentum into NCCAA Regionals and captured a Regional Championship with a 2-0 win over Faith Baptist in the Finals.  Coming into Nationals in Kissimmee, Florida as the #7 seeded team, the Freemen were outshot, yet only lost each game by 2 goals.  The Women's Soccer team had a strong year as well, capturing their second straight CPAC Championship defeating Steinbach 6-0.  They carried that momentum into NCCAA Regionals where they defeated NCU 3-1 for their first ever Regional Finals berth, only to be defeated by Crown.

The Women's basketball team captured the NIAC championship as the host team.  The Freemen came into the tournament as the #1 seed and defeated Trinity Bible College for the title.  The Men's Basketball team had another tough season, yet had a bright spot during the NIAC Tournament as well.  With the BLUE MAN CREW making more noise than ever had been heard in recent Providence athletics history, the #7 seeded Freemen played hard against Oak Hills and defeated them 74-66 for their first win of the tournament.  Even though the Freemen fell to Alex Tech by only 2 points in the Consolation Finals, the Freemen finished the tournament in 6th place, bettering their #7 seed entrance.

The Men's Volleyball team has also been very successful capturing the NIVC Championship in Michigan as well as coming in second place at the NIRSA National Championships in Kentucky.  Women's Volleyball also had success capturing a NIAC championship in Owatonna, Minnesota.  The Men's hockey team finished the season 2-6 and finished third in CPAC while the Women's Hockey Team finished 4th in the annual CPAC Tournament in St Pierre.

2007–2008 Providence Freemen athletics wrap-up
While the Providence varsity teams are not as strong as they used to be they still managed to capture some strong moments this year. The men's soccer team had a very strong season competing in CPAC and the NCCAA. The Varsity Men's soccer team won the CPAC championship once again over the CMU Blazers 2-0. They carried that momentum into NCCAA Regionals and captured a Regional Championship with a 1-0 win over archrivals Crown College in the Finals. Coming into Nationals in Kissimmee, Florida as the #7-seeded team, the Freemen were outshot, yet only lost their first contest in overtime and then won their second contest in penalty kicks.  They ended up finishing 6th in the nation.  The women's soccer team had their best year yet, capturing their second straight CPAC Championship defeating archrivals CMU 2-1 in overtime in the Finals. They carried that momentum into NCCAA Regionals where they were defeated by Crown College 1-0, yet were able to grab the wildcard seed into Nationals.  At Nationals, the women's soccer team was able to pull off a win in their first contest in penalty kicks.  After a loss to Philadelphia in their second contest, the Freelady's won the '3rd-place game' in dramatic fashion, winning 1-0 in overtime against Manhattan.

The men's hockey team returned to its former glory as they finished the season with a mediocre 2-4-2 record, finishing in the basement of the three-team CPAC men's hockey league.  However, coming into the CPAC Final Four tournament in Landmark, the Freemen were able to upset the defending CPAC champion ACC Cougars in the semi-finals by a score of 2-1.  Providence played their archrivals from CMU in the finals only to be defeated by a score of 4-3.

Men's Soccer
2007 NCCAA North-Central Regional Champions 
2007 CPAC Champions

2006 Regular Season (NCCAA/CPAC)

2007 CPAC Championships
Winnipeg, Manitoba

2007 NCCAA Regionals
Otterburne, Manitoba

2007 NCCAA Nationals
Kissimmee, Florida

Women's Soccer
2007 NCCAA North Central Regional Finalists 
2007 NCCAA Nationals: 3rd Place 
2007 CPAC Champions

2006 Regular Season (NCCAA/CPAC)

2007 CPAC Championships
Winnipeg, Manitoba

2007 NCCAA Regionals
Otterburne, Manitoba

2007 NCCAA Nationals
Kissimmee, Florida

Women's Volleyball
2006 NIAC Champions

NCCAA Pre-Season Tourney (September 8–9)
Minneapolis, Minnesota

Sept. 21: vs. Trinity Baptist (NCCAA) Win: 3-1

Trinity Invitational Tournament (September 22–23)
Ellendale, North Dakota

Providence Invitationanl Tournament (September 30–31)
Steinbach, Manitoba

Oct. 4: @ Canadian Mennonite University (CPAC)  Win: 3-0

Oct. 11: vs. Canadian Mennonite University (CPAC)  Win: 3-0

NIAC Championships (October 13–14)
Owatonna, Minnesota

Red River College Tournament (October 20–21)
Winnipeg, Manitoba

NCCA Regional Championships (October 27–28)
Ankeny, Iowa

Men's Volleyball
2007 NIVC Conference Champions

Jan. 24 @ College U. de St. Boniface (CPAC)  Win: 3-0

Jan. 30 vs College U. de St. Boniface (CPAC)  Win: 3-1

Chaos In The Cornfield (NIRSA Div-1) (February 3)
Iowa State University: Aimes, Iowa

Tourney On The Tundra (February 24–25)
North Dakota State University: Fargo, North Dakota
Finished: 1st Place

UCF Spring Shootout (NIRSA Div-1) (March 10–11)
University of Central Florida: Orlando, Florida

NIVC Conference Championships (March 30 - April 1)
Michigan Technological University: Houghton, Michigan

NIRSA National Championships (April 12–14)
Louisville, Kentucky

Men's basketball

2006-2007 regular season

NCCAA Regional Championships (February 15–17)
Owatonna, Minnesota

NIAC Conference Tournament (February 22–24)
Winnipeg, Manitoba

ACCA National Tournament (March 1–3)
Bethany, Oklahoma

Women's basketball
2007 NIAC Champions 
2007 3rd Place ACCA 
2007 NCCAA North Central Regional Finalists

2006-2007 regular season

NCCAA Regional Championships (February 15–17)
Owatonna, Minnesota

NIAC Conference Tournament (February 22–24)
Winnipeg, Manitoba

ACCA National Tournament (March 1–3)
Bethany, Oklahoma

Men's Hockey

2007-2008 CPAC Final Four

References

External links
 Providence College
 Providence Freemen Mens Varsity Hockey 08-09

University and college sports clubs in Canada
Sport in Eastman Region, Manitoba